Lipscomb is a surname. Notable people with the surname include:

A. W. G. Lipscomb, Superintendent of the Aborigines Welfare Board in New South Wales, Australia from 1940
Andrew A. Lipscomb (1816–1890), American clergyman and educator
Bob Lipscomb (1837–1895), English cricketer
David Lipscomb (1831–1917), preacher and founder of Lipscomb University
Eugene Lipscomb (1931–1963), American football player
Frank Lipscomb (1863–1951), English cricketer
George Lipscomb (1773–1846), English physician and county historian of Buckinghamshire
Glenard P. Lipscomb (1915–1970), US politician and submarine namesake
Guy Lipscomb (1917–2009), industrialist and watercolorist from Columbia, South Carolina
Kalija Lipscomb (born 1997), American football player
Lila Lipscomb, who appears in the movie Fahrenheit 9/11
Mance Lipscomb (1895–1976), American blues musician
Nathaniel Lipscomb (1931–1961), American serial killer
Oscar Hugh Lipscomb (1931–2020), American Roman Catholic Archbishop
Oswald Lipscomb (1872–1930), American carpenter
Suzannah Lipscomb (born 1978), English historian
William Lipscomb (1919–2011), American inorganic chemist

See also 

 Lipscombe